Bob Herbert Bonte (1 August 1929 – 3 September 1988) was a Dutch breaststroke swimmer. He competed at the 1948 Olympics in the 200 m event and finished in eighth place. Later that year he set world records in the 400 m and 500 m distances, which became obsolete a few months later. Between 1947 and 1951 Bonte set four national records and won three national titles in the 200 m breaststroke. Bonte was a hairdresser, and ran his own hair salon.

References

1929 births
1988 deaths
Dutch male breaststroke swimmers
Swimmers at the 1948 Summer Olympics
Olympic swimmers of the Netherlands
Swimmers from Amsterdam